is a Japanese former competitive figure skater. He is the 2001 Winter Universiade bronze medalist and placed eighth at the 2002 Four Continents Championships. 

Okazaki retired from competitive skating in 2002 and began working as a coach. He is also an ISU Technical Specialist for Japan.

Programs

Results
GP: Champions Series/Grand Prix

References

External links
 

1976 births
Japanese male single skaters
Living people
International Skating Union technical specialists
Sportspeople from Hiroshima
Universiade medalists in figure skating
Universiade bronze medalists for Japan
Competitors at the 1999 Winter Universiade
Competitors at the 2001 Winter Universiade
20th-century Japanese people